Reading station or Reading railway station may refer to:

United Kingdom
Reading railway station, Reading, Berkshire, England
Reading Green Park railway station, a proposed railway station in Reading, Berkshire, England
Reading Southern railway station, a former railway station in Reading, Berkshire, England
Reading West railway station, Reading, Berkshire, England

United States

Massachusetts
Reading station (MBTA), Reading, Massachusetts

Pennsylvania

 Former Reading Railroad stations may be known as simply Reading Station:
 Reading Outer station, Reading
 Franklin Street station (Pennsylvania), Reading
 Lebanon station (Reading Railroad), Lebanon
 Reading Terminal, Philadelphia
 Pottstown station, Pottstown 
 Phoenixville station, Phoenixville 
 Royersford station, Royersford 
 Birdsboro station (Reading Railroad), Birdsboro
 Pottsville station, Pottsville, Pennsylvania
 Schuylkill Haven station, Schuylkill Haven

See also
Reading (disambiguation)
Redding station (disambiguation)
Reading Power Station, a gas-fuelled power station in Tel Aviv, Israel
Reading power station UK, a former coal-fired power station in Reading, England